Tectura is a genus of small to medium-sized sea snails, true limpets, marine gastropod mollusks in the family Lottiidae. Tectura comes from Latin tegō‎ ("I cover").

Species 
Species in the genus Tectura include:

 Tectura depicta (Hinds, 1842)
 Tectura filosa (Carpenter, 1865)
 Tectura palacea (Gould, 1853)
 Tectura pusilla Jeffreys, 1883 
 Tectura rosacea (Carpenter, 1864)
 Tectura tenera (C. B. Adams, 1845)
 Tectura virginea (Müller, 1776) - White tortoiseshell limpet
Species brought into synonymy 
 Tectura antillarum (Sowerby I, 1831): synonym of Lottia antillarum G. B. Sowerby I, 1834
 Tectura coppingeri E. A. Smith, 1881: synonym of Iothia emarginuloides (Philippi, 1868)
 Tectura fenestrata (Reeve, 1855): synonym of Lottia fenestrata (Reeve, 1855)
 Tectura fluviatilis Blanford, 1867: synonym of Potamacmaea fluviatilis (Blanford, 1867)
 Tectura fulva (Müller O.F., 1776): synonym of Iothia fulva (O. F. Müller, 1776)
 Tectura persona (Rathke, 1833): synonym of Lottia persona (Rathke, 1833)
 Tectura radiata Pease, 1860: synonym of Williamia radiata (Pease, 1860)
 Tectura reticulata Seguenza, 1876: synonym of Veleropilina reticulata (Seguenza, 1876)
 Tectura rugosa Jeffreys, 1883: synonym of Iothia fulva (O. F. Müller, 1776)
 Tectura scutum Eschscholtz, 1833: synonym of Lottia scutum (Rathke, 1833)
 Tectura tahitensis Pease, 1868: synonym of Cellana taitensis (Röding, 1798)
 Tectura tessulata (O. F. Müller, 1776): synonym of Testudinalia testudinalis (O. F. Müller, 1776)
 Tectura testudinalis (O. F. Müller, 1776)- Common tortoiseshell limpet : synonym of the accepted name Testudinalia testudinalis (Müller, 1776)

References

 Vaught, K.C. (1989). A classification of the living Mollusca. American Malacologists: Melbourne, FL (USA). . XII, 195 pp
 Gofas, S.; Le Renard, J.; Bouchet, P. (2001). Mollusca, in: Costello, M.J. et al. (Ed.) (2001). European register of marine species: a check-list of the marine species in Europe and a bibliography of guides to their identification. Collection Patrimoines Naturels, 50: pp. 180–213

External links 

Lottiidae